Villalmán is a locality located in the municipality of Sahagún, in León province, Castile and León, Spain. As of 2020, it has a population of 3.

Geography 
Villalmán is located 66km east-southeast of León, Spain.

References

Populated places in the Province of León